The law of the U.S. state of Minnesota consists of several levels, including a state constitution, statutes, session law, administrative rules, and other forms of law.

Sources of law

Constitutional law 
The Minnesota Constitution is the supreme law in the state.

Minnesota Statutes 
Minnesota Statutes are the general and permanent laws of the state.

Minnesota Session Laws 
Minnesota Laws (also referred to as Minnesota Session Laws, Laws of Minnesota, or simply "session laws") are the annual compilation of acts passed by the Minnesota Legislature and signed by the governor of Minnesota, or enacted by the legislature when overriding a governor's veto. Laws of a permanent nature are codified into Minnesota Statutes. Minnesota Laws may also include uncodified laws, local laws, appropriations, and proposed state constitutional amendments. A proper citations is "Laws of Minnesota 1988, chapter 469, article 1, section 1".

Minnesota Rules 
Minnesota Rules (also referred to as Minnesota Administrative Rules) are the codified regulations by state government agencies.

Publication 
The Office of the Revisor of Statutes publishes compilations of Minnesota Statues, Minnesota Laws, and Minnesota Rules.

See also 

 Minnesota Supreme Court

References

External Links 
 Minnesota Constitution
 Minnesota Rules
 Minnesota Statutes
 Minnesota Session Laws

Government of Minnesota